Embrace the Herd is the sole studio album by English band The Gist, released in 1982 by record label Rough Trade.

Track listing 

 Far Concern	
 Love At First Sight
 Fretting Away	
 Public Girl
 Clean Bridges
 Simian
 Embrace The Herd	
 Iambic Pentameter	
 Carnival Headache
 Concrete Slopes
 The Long Run
 Dark Shots

Credits 
Produced and engineered by Phil Legg

 Stuart Moxham, vocals, arrangements and instruments (#1-5, 7-12)
 Phil Moxham, bass guitar (#2,5,9)
 Dave Dearnaley, electric guitar (#2,4,5), slide guitar (#5)
 Wendy Smith, vocals (#4,5)
 Alison Statton, vocals (#5) 
 Viv Goldman, vocals (#5) 
 Debbie Pritchard, vocals (#6)
 Lewis Mottram, instruments (#6)
 Nixon, vocals (#10)
 Jake Bowie, cymbal (#11)
 Charles Bullen, hi-hat, snare, tambourine (#11)
 Phil Legg, tom tom (#11)
 Epic Soundtracks (aka Kevin Paul Godfrey), drums (#12)

Reception 

Trouser Press called it "a lovely little record".

It was ranked at number 41 on Mojo magazine's "Buried Treasures" list.

References

External links 
 

1982 debut albums